Lanza's leaf-toed gecko (Hemidactylus ophiolepoides) is a species of gecko. It is found in Ethiopia and Somaliland.

References

Hemidactylus
Reptiles described in 1978
Reptiles of Ethiopia
Reptiles of Somalia